The Baishuei River is a river in Taiwan which flows through Tainan City for 20 km (12.427 mi). It is a tributary of Jishui River. Baihe Reservoir is located on Baishuei River. A church named for the river (Pe̍h-chúi-khe Kàu-hōe) was established in the 1870s.

See also
List of rivers in Taiwan

References

Rivers of Taiwan
Landforms of Tainan